Emergency Situation is a 2022 Czech comedy film directed by Jiří Havelka. It is classified as a chamber tragicomedy.. The plot takes place over the course of one day, and the initial idea of ​​the screenwriter and director Havelka was brought about by a real event, when in February 2019, a train with passengers ran several kilometers without a driver on the Křižanov–Studenec railway line. The premiere date was February 3, 2022.

Cast
Jana Plodková as Romana
Igor Chmela as Roman
Jenovéfa Boková as Kamila
Jaroslav Plesl as engineer Karaivanov
Alois Švehlík as Brukner
Ctirad Götz as gamekeeper
Tereza Marečková as Soňa
Václav Kopta as strojvůdce
Marie Ludvíková as Marie
Robert Mikluš as adviser
Fedir Kis as guitar player
Daniel Horečný as bass player
Milan Koritják as drummer
Oliver Vyskočil as Petr
Václav Vašák as hejtman
Magdaléna Sidonová as coworker
Agáta Červinková as secretary

References

External links
 
 Emergency Situation at CSFD.cz 

2022 comedy films
2022 films
2020s Czech-language films
Comedy films based on actual events
Czech comedy films